Sudanese refugees in Israel refers to citizens of Sudan who have sought refuge in Israel due to military conflict at home, and to those who moved there illegally as migrant workers. In 2008, there were 4,000 Sudanese in Israel, 1,200 from Darfur and the remainder Christians from South Sudan. The majority entered through the Israeli-Egypt border. Most live in Tel Aviv, Arad, Eilat and Bnei Brak.

History 

The civil wars in Sudan that have been taking place on and off since 1955, the subsequent destabilization and economic collapse caused by the country's infrastructure and economy, and the fighting in Darfur, forced millions of Sudanese civilians to flee their homes and cities.
In 2006, largely owing to the extensive flow of Sudanese and Eritreans crossing into Israel by land from Egypt, Israel witnessed a significant rise in the number of asylum seekers. While in 2005 only 450 applications were registered, the number for 2008 had risen to 7,700.

The increase in Sudanese entries to Israel since 2006 is attributed to a demonstration by Sudanese refugees outside UNHCR's offices in Cairo in 2005, where Egyptian police killed 28 asylum seekers. Sudanese asylum seekers also say that deteriorating asylum conditions and lack of durable solutions in Egypt has played a major role in their decision to come to Israel. Since the majority have been living in Egypt since the 1990s, their crossing into Israel can be described as a case of onward secondary movement. Israel is also perceived as a bridge to Europe, and its strong economy compared to neighboring countries has encouraged asylum seekers to pursue their luck there.

In 2008–2009, around 30 migrants were shot and killed by Egyptian security forces as they attempted to cross into Israel. In addition, many African migrants en route to Israel face torture, organ theft, rape and assault by traffickers in the Sinai who hold them for weeks, sometimes months, to demand more money. A survey of 284 migrants published in late February 2011 found that over half told of abuse by the smugglers that included being burnt, branded, hung by the hands or feet and raped.

In 2012, due to a near-doubling in the flow of African seeking refugee status, Israel began building a fence along the border and publicized plans to build a detention facility for infiltrators.

In spite of the risks and abusive treatment by smugglers, smuggler networks run by Bedouin groups in the Sinai desert have transported growing numbers of Sudanese and other African asylum seekers across to Israel.

Legal status 

Israel supported the founding of the 1951 Convention relating to the Status of Refugees, becoming a signatory to the Convention in 1954. But although it actively participated in the development of the international refugee system, Israel did not institute the corresponding legal framework at home.

Following pressure from UNHCR, a temporary humanitarian protection arrangement was established in 1999, benefiting refugees from war-torn countries in Africa. In 2002, an Israeli asylum procedure was established with the launch of the National Status Granting Body, an inter-ministerial agency responsible for assessing asylum applications processed by UNHCR Israel, advising the minister of the interior, who held the authority on final decisions.

However, Israeli authorities have yet to devise and implement a clear approach towards asylum-seekers. Due to authorities' inexperience with asylum, early official responses to the new arrivals from the Egyptian border included conflicting and ad hoc policies. Finally, in July 2008, the government established the Population, Immigration, and Border Crossings Authority, responsible for processing asylum requests and determining refugee-status. In July 2009, Israeli authorities officially took over this responsibility from UNHCR, and since then asylum policies have become clearer. The Israeli have granted temporary protection, assistance, and work permits for asylum seekers, but they have also detained thousands and forced hundreds of Sudanese and other African asylum seekers to return to Egypt.

Among Sudanese refugees in Israel, 850 are asking for asylum from persecution in Sudan, including 200 children. The fact that Israel and Sudan lack diplomatic relations have complicated the status of Sudanese asylum seekers. Since Sudan is considered by Israel as an "enemy state", many Sudanese refugees have been detained according to Israeli law. But detainees were sometimes released in order to make room for new arrivals. Additionally, Sudanese have avoided detention by registering with UNHCR in Tel Aviv.

At the same time, Israeli authorities have partnered with UNHCR in Israel to grant some form of temporary protection for thousands of asylum seekers, even granting them access to social services and allowing them to work. Although Israelis are legally barred from employing Sudanese asylum seekers, the ban is not enforced, as it is in the authorities' interest for asylum seekers to support themselves financially.

According to a Supreme Court of Israel decision on 13 January 2011, the employers of refugees and asylum seekers will not be fined; thus, de facto, they can legally work in Israel.

In February 2015, the government provided figures to the High Court regarding requests for asylum from Sudanese citizens. Since 2009, there were 3,165 such requests, but only 45 received a reply. Of those 45, 40 were rejected and 5 were granted temporary residency. In addition, 976 of the Sudanese asylum seekers withdrew their requests or left Israel. Only four Sudanese or Eritrean persons have been granted refugee status.

Reactions in Israel 

There is a mixed reaction in Israel: Large protests have been organized mainly by citizens of neighborhoods in South Tel Aviv who claim that their safety and life quality was ruined by the presence of illegal immigrants from Sudan and Eritrea. Also, there have been demonstrations in support of the refugees.

Recent trends 

According to the Israeli Interior Ministry, the number of African migrants entering Israel illegally through Egypt has fallen drastically since Egyptian political upheaval began in January 2011. Around 700 migrants entered Israel in January and February, less than half the average monthly number in 2010. The decrease in migrant flow is attributed to the increased violence in the Sinai desert between Egyptian police and Bedouin smugglers.

In February 2012, Israel's Interior Ministry announced that South Sudanese nationals must repatriate by March, arguing they no longer need protection since South Sudan gained independence. They will be given $1,300 and a plane ticket if they voluntarily resettle, but any who do not repatriate will be deported.

As of March 2021, there were about 6,200 Sudanese migrants in Israel. The Israeli and Sudanese governments discussed the potential return of migrants to Sudan after their normalization agreement.

See also 

 Refugees of Sudan
 Illegal immigration from Africa to Israel
 Sudanese refugees in Egypt
 Sudanese refugees in Chad
 Refugee#African refugees in Israel
 International response to the War in Darfur
 Refugee kidnappings in Sinai
 Usumain Baraka

References

External links 
 Faces of Exile, A HIAS Israel website featuring narrative testimony of asylum seekers
 Until our hearts are completely hardened, Report on asylum procedures in Israel, Hotline for Refugees and Migrants, April 2012
 Sudanese Refugees in Israel
 The Association of Sudanese Refugees in Israel Facebook community
 Refugees set their sights on Israel
 Plitim, refugees support voluntary association

Expatriates in Israel
North African diaspora in Israel
Forced migration
Israel
Israel